This article lists the recipients of the Jackie Robinson Sports Award, which is an honorary NAACP Image Award. The award is given to athletes who have promoted social justice through creative endeavors. It was retired after 1999 and revived in 2017 for LeBron James.

The NAACP Image Award winners for the Jackie Robinson Sports Award:

References

NAACP Image Awards
Social justice